Giuseppe Santoro may refer to:

Giuseppe Santoro (diplomat) (1930–2017)
Giuseppe Santoro (general) (1894–1975)